The Teesside Steelworks was a large steelworks that formed a continuous stretch along the south bank of the River Tees from the towns of Middlesbrough to Redcar in North Yorkshire, England.  At its height there were 91 blast furnaces within a 10-mile radius of the area. By the end of the 1970s there was only one left on Teesside.  Opened in 1979 and located near the mouth of the River Tees, the Redcar blast furnace was the second largest in Europe. 

The majority of the steelworks, including the Redcar blast furnace, Redcar and South Bank coke ovens and the BOS plant at Lackenby closed in 2015. The Teesside Beam Mill and some support services still operate at the Lackenby part of the site.

On 1 October 2022, the Basic Oxygen Steelmaking (BOS) Plant at Lackenby was demolished in one of the largest single explosive demolition operations in the country in 75 years.

History
1875
Steel production on Teesside begins when Bolckow, Vaughan & Co Ltd, formerly Bolckow, Vaughan, opens the Cleveland Steelworks in Middlesbrough.  Using the Bessemer process, the works have three blast furnaces.
1876
Albert John Dorman enters into a partnership with Albert de Lande Long taking over the West Marsh Ironworks in Middlesbrough.  Dorman Long is founded. 
1879
Bolckow, Vaughan & Co Ltd. acquire the Southbank Steelworks. The firm is also persuaded by Sidney Gilchrist Thomas to adopt the process which he and his cousin Percy Gilchrist developed. This allows the use of local ironstone which had a high phosphorus content. Bolckow, Vaughan & Co Ltd were already well established producers of Iron owning many Ironworks and furnaces and were seen as the driving force behind the rapid expansion of Middlesbrough or "Ironopolis" and Great Britain's leading producer of pig iron. 
1889
Dorman Long is registered enabling it to take over the business from the firm of the same name.  The firm has acquired the Brittania works in Middlesbrough.  
1899
Dorman Long builds a new steel works at the Clarence works in a joint venture with Bell Brothers. 
1900
Bolckow, Vaughan & Co Ltd acquire the Clay Lane works and shift production from Iron to steel, owning 21 of the 91 blast furnaces in the Cleveland area and become the largest producers of steel in Great Britain and possibly the world. 
1902
The first integrated steelworks is built at Cargo Fleet by Dorman Long who also acquire the other half of Bell brothers.
1905
Bolckow, Vaughan & Co Ltd produce 820,000 tons of pig iron which is equivalent to 8.5% of the entire country's total output. 
1914
Dorman Long now has a workforce of around 20,000 and is one of the dominant producers of steel in Britain and in Europe. 
1917
Dorman Long builds a new blast furnace at Redcar with a cost of £5.4 million. Some of the steel produced here, along with steel from the Brittania and Cargo Fleet steelworks, is used to build structures including the Sydney Harbour Bridge, Tyne Bridge and the Auckland Harbour Bridge.
1918
Dorman Long opens the new Cleveland works.
1922
Dorman Long wins the contract to build the Sydney Harbour Bridge. 
The majority of the steel used in its construction is produced by Dorman long's Bridge and Constructional Works division in Middlesbrough. 
1923
Bolckow, Vaughan & Co Ltd acquire Redpath, Brown & Co, manufacturers of structural steel.
1924
Dorman Long wins the contract to build the Tyne Bridge in Newcastle.
1929
Bolckow, Vaughan & Co Ltd. are effectively bankrupt and is forced into a takeover by Dorman Long who by this point is also struggling financially.   
1946
The Lackenby development is built by Dorman Long between the Redcar and Cleveland Works.
1967
Dorman Long is absorbed into the newly created nationalised company, British Steel Corporation.
1979
New blast furnace opens at the former Redcar site using the open hearth process.  It is the second largest of its kind in Europe and Teesside's sole remaining blast furnace. 
1988
British Steel is privatised to form British Steel plc. 
1999
British Steel plc merged with Netherlands-based steel maker Koninklijke Hoogovens to form Corus Group. Corus utilised the site for basic oxygen steelmaking, using iron produced at the company's Redcar blast furnace. 
2003

Corus announce that the production at Teesside Cast Products (TCP) as a surplus to its needs. 

2007

Corus is bought by Tata Steel.

2009

Corus announced partial mothballing of the Teesside blast furnace. Approx. 1,700 jobs eliminated. To help the workers, a Corus Response Group was formed which developed a comprehensive package of support. This plan was in place over the past 10 months of announcement and included employment experts on site from January 2010. Support was put in place to help affected workers with individual sessions to update CVs, highlight job opportunities and look at retraining options. The response group was also supposed to work with the Teesside Cast Products function to offer similar support.

SSI: 2012–2015 

On 24 February 2011, the steelworks was purchased by Thai-based Sahaviriya Steel Industries (SSI) at $469 million.  The acquisition was expected to create more than 800 jobs on top of the existing workforce of 700 and the plant was officially reopened 15 April 2012. 

18 September 2015, production paused due to the decline in steel prices. 

28 September 2015, plant "mothballed" again amid poor steel trading conditions across the world and a drop in steel prices. 

2 October, SSI UK enter into liquidation. 

12 October 2015 the receiver announced there was no realistic prospect of finding a buyer. The coke ovens are scheduled for extinguishing.

British Steel: 2016–2019
The remainder of the site still operational (Teesside Beam Mill and ancillary support services at Lackenby and the deep-water bulk handling terminal), was sold by Tata Steel to investment firm Greybull Capital on 1 June 2016.  As part of the deal, the historic British Steel name was resurrected. The new company includes the UK sites of Skinningrove and Scunthorpe as well as the Hayange rail plant in northern France.

Insolvency of British Steel 2019–Present

In May 2019 British Steel collapsed and was taken over by the UK Insolvency Service, and was later purchased in March 2020 by Jingye Group, who agreed to save the remaining jobs by modernising the steelworks.

Environmental aspects 
The closure of the steelworks, coupled with the running down of many coal-fired power stations and a UK Government carbon-tax, led to a 6% reduction in carbon emissions from the United Kingdom in 2016.

Transport
The site is situated alongside the A66 and A1085 dual carriageways. Main access is via the Lackenby and Redcar entrances, situated on the A1085.

The site is adjacent to Teesport that was used for iron ore, coal, and other raw material imports, and steel exports.

The site was served by the Redcar British Steel railway station, which opened on 19 June 1978. Northern discontinued service to the station in December 2019, prior to this the station (owned by Network Rail), was surrounded by private land, which prevented any public access to or from the station.

References

External links

Tata Steel Europe
Buildings and structures in Redcar and Cleveland
Buildings and structures in North Yorkshire
Ironworks and steelworks in England
Redcar